Mike Carter Field is a stadium in Tyler, Texas.  It is primarily used for baseball and was the home of Tyler Wildcatters.  The ballpark has a capacity of 4,000 people and opened in 1941. The field is the home of the Tyler Junior College Apaches baseball team.

References

Minor league baseball venues
Buildings and structures in Tyler, Texas
Baseball venues in East Texas
Baseball venues in Texas
1941 establishments in Texas
Sports venues completed in 1941
College baseball venues in the United States